Mustonen is a Finnish surname. Notable people with the surname include:

Aleksi Mustonen (b. 1995) – Finnish ice hockey player
Andres Mustonen (b. 1953) – Estonian conductor and violinist
Atte Mustonen (b. 1988) – Finnish racing driver
Helvi Mustonen (b. 1947) – Finnish artist
Henrik Mustonen (b. 1990) – Finnish squash player
Joel Mustonen (b. 1992) – Finnish ice-hockey player
Kaija Mustonen (b. 1941) – Finnish speed skater
Leo Mustonen (c1920-1942) – Finnish-American pilot
Liisa Mustonen (b. 1969) – Finnish film actress
Markus Mustonen – Swedish musician
Olli Mustonen (b. 1967) – Finnish pianist, composer, conductor
Paavo Mustonen (b. 1986) – Cook Islands footballer
Pasi Mustonen (b. 1960) – Finnish ice hockey coach
Risto Mustonen (1875–1941) – Finnish wrestler
Sami Mustonen (b. 1977) – Finnish skier
Sara Mustonen (1962–1979) – Finnish skier
Sara Mustonen (b. 1971) – Swedish cyclist 
Taneli Mustonen (b. 1978) – Finnish film director

Finnish-language surnames